Lacernidae is a family of bryozoans belonging to the order Cheilostomatida.

Genera

Genera:
 Arthropoma Levinsen, 1909
 Cheilonellopsis Gordon, 2014
 Clithriellum Brown, 1948

References

Cheilostomatida